Beth Burkhard Gaines (born September 17, 1959) is an American politician who served as a member of the California State Assembly for the 6th district from 2011 to 2016.

Early life and education
Gaines was born in Sacramento County, California in 1959. She attended the University of California, Irvine.

Career 
In 2011, Gaines' husband, Ted Gaines, won a special election to the California State Senate. On May 3, 2011, Gaines won a special election and became a Republican member of California State Assembly for from the 4th district. Gaines defeated Dennis Campanale with 55.6% of the votes.

Electoral history

Personal life 
Gaines' husband is Ted Gaines. They have six children.

References

External links
 
 Campaign website
 
 Join California Beth Gaines

1959 births
21st-century American politicians
21st-century American women politicians
Living people
Republican Party members of the California State Assembly
People from El Dorado Hills, California
People from Roseville, California
Politicians from Sacramento, California
Spouses of California politicians
University of California, Irvine alumni
Women state legislators in California